Patrik Jacko (born 26 September 1992 in Prešov) is a Slovak football midfielder who currently plays for Sitno Banská Štiavnica.

Club career 
Jacko made his Fortuna Liga debut for Tatran Prešov on 5 May 2012, playing the last minute of a 0–2 away loss against AS Trenčín.

References

External links
 1. FC Tatran Prešov profile
 
 Eurofotbal.cz profile

1992 births
Association football midfielders
Living people
Sportspeople from Prešov
Slovak footballers
Slovakia youth international footballers
1. FC Tatran Prešov players
FK Pohronie players
FK Sitno Banská Štiavnica players
Slovak Super Liga players
2. Liga (Slovakia) players
5. Liga players